Uladzimir Ignatik was the defending champion, but lost to Radu Albot in the first round.
Dudi Sela won the title defeating Teymuraz Gabashvili in the final 6–1, 6–2.

Seeds

Draw

Finals

Top half

Bottom half

References
 Main Draw
 Qualifying Draw

2013 ATP Challenger Tour
2013 Singles